Mark Chua may refer to:

 Mark Chua, Singaporean businessman who was implicated in the 2017 Ilocos Norte Tobacco Excise Tax funds controversy
 Mark Welson Chua, Filipino student of the University of Santo Tomas who exposed alleged irregularities in the Reserve Officers' Training Corps unit of the university; see Death of Mark Chua